PAO S. P. Korolev Rocket and Space Corporation Energia, also known as RSC Energia (RKK "Energiya"), is a Russian manufacturer of spacecraft and space station components. The company is the prime developer and contractor of the Russian crewed spaceflight program; it also owns a majority of Sea Launch. Its name is derived from Sergei Korolev, the first chief of its design bureau, and the Russian word for energy.

Overview 
Energia is the largest company of the Russian space industry and one of its key players. It is responsible for all operations involving human spaceflight and is the lead developer of the Soyuz and Progress spacecraft, and the lead developer of the Russian end of the International Space Station (ISS). In the mid-2000s, the company employed 22,000–30,000 people.

The enterprise has been awarded 4 Orders of Lenin, Order of the October Revolution and Russian Federation President's Message of Thanks. In addition, 14 cosmonauts employed by the company have been awarded the title "Hero of the Russian Federation".

Structure 

The company consists of the following subsidiaries and branches:
 Primary Design Bureau
 Baikonur branch
 ZAO Experimental Machine-building Plant
 ZAO Volzhskoye DB
 ZAO PO Kosmos

, 38% of the company's stock was owned by the Russian state.

History 
The company was founded on 26 August 1946 and has been known successively as: 
 Special Design Bureau number 1 of RD Institute number 88 ( or OKB-1 of NII-88)
 TsKBEM (Central Design Bureau of Experimental Machine Building) 
 NPO Energia
 S. P. Korolev RSC Energia.

It is named after the first chief of its design bureau Sergei Korolev (1946–1966). His successors as chief designers were: Vasily Mishin (1966–1974), Valentin Glushko (1974–1989),  (1989–2005), Nikolai Sevastianov (2005–2007). Its President and Chief designer was Vitaly Lopota, until 1 August 2014.

Korolev's design bureau was, beginning with the first artificial satellite Sputnik 1 and the first crewed spaceflight of Vostok 1, responsible for a major part of the Soviet space program. It was the main rival of OKB-52 (later known as TsKBM, then the design bureau of Vladimir Chelomei) during the Soviet crewed lunar programs and the Soviet space station program. OKB-1 was among others responsible for the development of the crewed Soyuz spacecraft and its Soyuz rocket, the N1 "Moon Shot" rocket, large parts of the Salyut space station program, the uncrewed Progress resupply craft and designed the Energia rocket for the Buran space shuttle program. Since the early beginnings of the Luna programme it designed many space probes, among others of the Venera, Zond and Mars program.

The company continues to dominate a large part of the Russian space program, and a considerable part of the World's space program, with its Soyuz spacecraft having become the only crewed spacecraft conducting regular flights and the exclusive crew transport vehicle for the International Space Station from the Space Shuttle retirement in 2011 and until the maiden flight of Crew Dragon Endeavour in 2020. 
The Chinese Shenzhou program is the only other program in the world with planned semi-regular crewed spaceflights.

The President of Energia, Vitaly Lopota, was removed from his post as president on August 1, 2014. Dmitry Rogozin indicated that this was the start of "long-awaited personnel reform in [the Russian] space industry... Tough times require tough decisions". Lopota was offered the position of vice president for technological development in the United Rocket and Space Corporation, the new company formed in 2013 to re-nationalize the Russian space industry.

Ongoing projects 
 Energia builds Russia's Soyuz MS spacecraft for three-person human spaceflight missions and Progress M robotic spacecraft for cargo missions:
 Russian Orbital Segment (ROS) of ISS: providing its own cosmonauts for International Space Station (ISS) expeditions; responsibility for all Russian scientific experiments.
 Sea Launch project participation – production of block DM-SL as the upper stage for Ukrainian launch vehicle Zenit-3SL.
 Universal Spacecraft Configuration – usage for development of: communications satellites, remote sensing satellites, navigation satellites and uncrewed orbital servicing satellites. USC was a basis for Yamal 100 and Yamal 200 satellites.

Future projects 
 Further assembly of International Space Station (ISS) Russian segment: development of Multipurpose Laboratory Module (together with Krunichev Space Centre) and "Oka" space production modules (not permanently attached to ISS).
 Development of new spacecraft with 3 stages:
 Modernization of "Soyuz TMA" spacecraft for human circum-lunar missions – pending commercial orders for space tourism.
 Development of "Parom" space tug (in order to replace Progress M cargo spacecraft).
 Development of multi-aimed Orel spacecraft (instead of abandoned Kliper project) for six persons.
 Development of crewed lunar program: landing by 2025, creating of permanent lunar base by 2030 in order to extract helium-3.
 Development of human Mars mission: landing beyond 2035.
 Development of Yamal-300 and Yamal-400 communication satellites for Gazprom corporation.
 Development of "Smotr" remote sensing satellites.
 Development of a pod designed for clearing near-Earth space of satellite debris. The new device is planned to be assembled by 2020 and tested by 2023. The concept is to build the device to use a nuclear power source so that it could remain on task for up to 15 years, primarily working in the geosynchronous orbit zone. Debris collected would be de-orbited to re-enter over the ocean.

Historic projects 
Over the years the products of Energia and its predecessors included:

IRBMs and ICBMs 
Including meteorological rockets as their modifications:
 R-1 (missile) R-1B, R-1V, R-1D, R-1E
 R-2 (missile)
 R-5 missile, R-5M, R-11, R-11A, R-11F
 R-7 Semyorka,
 R-7A Semyorka
 R-9 Desna
 RT-1
 RT-2

Launch vehicles 
 R-7 (rocket family)
 Sputnik (rocket)
 Luna (rocket)
 Vostok (rocket family)
 Vostok-2 (rocket)
 Vostok-2M
 Vostok-K
 Vostok-L
 Polyot (rocket)
 Voskhod (rocket)
 Molniya (rocket)
 Soyuz (rocket family)
 Soyuz (rocket)
 Soyuz-L
 Soyuz-M
 Soyuz/Vostok
 N1 rocket as a part of N1-L3 lunar complex
 Blok D
 Energia
 Energia II
 "Yamal", "Kvant", "Kvant-1", "Avrora";
 upper stages for different kinds of launch vehicles: blocks L and DM;

Research, observation and communication Earth satellites 
 Sputnik program
 Sputnik 1
 Sputnik 2
 Sputnik 3
 Sputnik 4
 Sputnik 5
 Sputnik 6
 Sputnik 7
 Sputnik 8
 Sputnik 9
 Sputnik 10
 Sputnik 19
 Sputnik 20
 Sputnik 21
 Sputnik 22
 Sputnik 24
 Sputnik 25
 Elektron (satellite)
 Zenit (satellite)
 Molniya (satellite)
 Signal (satellite)
 BelKA
 DZZ

Deep Space exploration spacecraft 
 Luna programme
 Luna 1958A
 Luna 1958B
 Luna 1958C
 Luna 1
 Luna 1959A
 Luna 2
 Luna 3
 Luna 1960A
 Luna 1960B
 Luna 1963B
 Luna 4
 Luna 1964A
 Luna 1964B
 Cosmos 60
 Luna 1965A
 Luna 5
 Luna 6
 Luna 7
 Luna 8
 Luna 9
 Cosmos 111
 Luna 10
 Luna 1966A
 Luna 11
 Luna 12
 Luna 13
 Luna 1968A
 Luna 14
 Luna 1969A
 Luna 1969B
 Luna 1969C
 Luna 15
 Cosmos 300
 Cosmos 305
 Luna 1970A
 Luna 1970B
 Luna 16
 Luna 17
 Luna 18
 Luna 19
 Luna 20
 Luna 21
 Luna 22
 Luna 23
 Luna 1975A
 Luna 24
 Luna 8K72
 Venera
 Cosmos 27
 Venera 2
 Venera 3
 Venera 4
 Venera 5
 Venera 6
 Venera 7
 Venera 8
 Cosmos 482
 Venera 9
 Venera 10
 Venera 11
 Venera 12
 Venera 13
 Venera 14
 Venera 15
 Venera 16
 Mars program
 Mars 1M
 Mars 1
 Mars 1969A
 Mars 1969B
 Cosmos 419
 Mars 2
 Mars 3
 Mars 4
 Phobos program
 Mars 96
 Zond program
 Zond 1
 Zond 1964A
 Zond 2
 Zond 3
 Zond 1967A
 Zond 1967B
 Zond 4
 Zond 5
 Zond 6
 Zond 7
 Zond 8

Cargo spacecraft 
 Progress (spacecraft)
 Progress-M
 Progress-M1
 Progress 7K-TG

Crewed spacecraft 
 Vostok programme
 Vostok (spacecraft)
 Voskhod programme
 Voskhod (spacecraft)
 Soyuz programme
 Soyuz (spacecraft)
 Soyuz A
 Soyuz B
 Soyuz 7K-L1
 Soyuz 7K-L3
 Soyuz 7K-LOK
 Soyuz 7K-OK
 Soyuz 7K-OKS
 Soyuz 7K-T
 Soyuz 7K-TM
 Soyuz-T
 Soyuz-TM
 Soyuz TM-1
 Soyuz-TMA
 Soyuz TMA-M
 Soyuz-V
 Military Soyuz
 Buran programme
 Buran (spacecraft)
 Kliper
 LK (spacecraft)
 Orel (spacecraft)

Earth space stations 
 Salyut programme
 Salyut 1
 Salyut 2
 Cosmos 557
 Salyut 3
 Salyut 4
 Salyut 5
 Salyut 6
 Salyut 7
 Mir
 Modules of the International Space Station, see the Russian Orbital Segment
 Zarya
 Zvezda
 Pirs
 Poisk
 Rassvet

Lunar orbital spacecraft 
 Soyuz A
 Soyuz 7K-L1
 Soyuz 7K-L3 with Lunar Landing Module (as a part of N1-L3 lunar complex).

Committee of innovative youth projects 

Committee of Innovative Youth Projects (Russian: Комитет инновационных проектов молодежи) also known as KIPM of RSC Energia is a network structure that unites specialists and heads of different divisions to quickly develop and launch innovative products. KIPM was established in early 2016 on the initiative of a group of young engineers from the RSC Energia. The main task of the new structure is to give young specialists the opportunity to realize their creative ideas. The main criterion for projects selecting is their potential demand in the market.

Currently KIPM work on five projects:
 Unmanned aerial vehicle remote power supply
 1U-6U Cubesat Deployer
 Parachute system with an elastic linkage and tandem cargo separation
 Assembly of lunar expedition complex at LEO
 Hardware and software system for space experiments onboard crewed space station.

See also 

 RKK Energiya museum
 Aerospace manufacturer
 Soyuz spacecraft
 MirCorp
 NewSpace
 Kliper
 Orbital Technologies Commercial Space Station
 Parom
 Prospective Piloted Transport System
 United Rocket and Space Corporation
 Roscosmos

Note

References

External links 

  
 Rocket and space corporation Energia (1946–1996). The book for the 50th anniversary of the enterprise
 The history of RSC Energia, from 1946 to 2011. Three volumes in electronic form.
 RSC Energia museum
 KIPM of RSC Energia
 "I look back and have no regrets. " - Author: Abramov, Anatoly Petrovich: publisher "New format" Barnaul, 2022. 

Energia
Aerospace companies of the Soviet Union
Companies based in Moscow Oblast
Soviet and Russian space institutions
Rocket engine manufacturers of Russia
Manufacturing companies established in 1946
1946 establishments in the Soviet Union
Technology companies established in 1946
Sergei Korolev
Government-owned companies of Russia
Russian brands
 
Companies listed on the Moscow Exchange
Design bureaus